The Thomas R. Pierce House (also known as the Pierce Hotel) is a historic house in Bushnell, Florida. It is locally significant as an outstanding example of vernacular architecture, and the only historic hotel or boarding house from this period remaining in Bushnell.

Description and history 
The vernacular house was built around 1888 and originally functioned as the family home of Thomas R. Pierce, his wife Fannie Pierce, and their four children.  It also accommodated more persons and served as a boarding house.

It is a two-story irregularly planned house resting upon stone piers.  The house was restored during 1990–94.  At the time of its listing it was operated as a bed and breakfast

On February 16, 1996, it was added to the National Register of Historic Places.

References

External links
The Thomas R. Pierce (Historical) House in Bushnell (Sumter county) Florida USA ~ ca. 1888, YouTube video, December 2020, which includes narration of some or all of the NRHP registration document
 Bushnell Historical Trail

Hotels in Florida
Boarding houses
Houses in Sumter County, Florida
Houses on the National Register of Historic Places in Florida
National Register of Historic Places in Sumter County, Florida
Vernacular architecture in Florida